Joe Martinez may refer to:
Joe P. Martínez (1920–1943), World War II Medal of Honor recipient
Joe Martinez (baseball) (born 1983), Major League Baseball pitcher
Joe A. Martinez (born 1975), ring announcer
Joe L. Martínez (c. 1909–1998), Associate Justice of the New Mexico Supreme Court